The Bochorisvili is a Georgian family name from the Racha region which is located at the heart of Georgia.

The Bochorisvili family name comes from these towns of the Racha region: Samthisi, Qedisubani, Dzirageuli and Jvarisa.

References

Georgian-language surnames